The 2021–22 Denver Pioneers men's ice hockey season is the 73rd season of play for the program. They represent the University of Denver in the 2021–22 NCAA Division I men's ice hockey season and for the 9th season in the National Collegiate Hockey Conference (NCHC). The Pioneers are coached by David Carle, in his fourth season, and play their home games at Magness Arena.  The team won the 2022 NCAA Division I men's ice hockey tournament for their 9th Title.

Season

Alternating streaks
After a substandard year in 2021, Denver entered the year as a bit of a mystery, particularly with how unique the previous COVID-19-shortened season had been. The Pioneers returned with many of their top players, including starting goaltender Magnus Chrona, team captain Cole Guttman and top prospect Bobby Brink. The chief unknown, however, was how well the new crop of players would mesh with the team. Denver welcomed eight new players onto the team and while graduate transfer Cameron Wright was a known quantity, the Pioneers were also adding four young players drafted by NHL teams.

Early returns were good for Denver as the team shot out of the gate with four wins to open the season. In those matches the offense was overpowering, averaging 6 goals a night and pushing the Pioneers into the top-10 rankings. The once criticism at the time was that Denver had played relatively weak teams. That logic bore out when Denver followed up the quick success with four consecutive losses, all to ranked teams. During the losing streak, Denver's offense went quiet, being limited to just a single goal in three of the games. The mounting defeats also dropped the team down the rankings, and they were nearly out of the top-15 by early November. Each loss had come on the road and Denver's return to the Magness Arena coincided with the team getting back on track. Denver followed up their skid with a seven-game winning streak that included its first victories of the year against a ranked team. Critically, the defense was also able to settle down during the stretch and allowed more than 2 goals against on just one occasion.

Golden Chrona
After concluding the first half of the regular season with a loss to Minnesota Duluth, Denver returned to action with dominating performances against Alaska. Despite vastly outplaying the Nanooks, Denver only managed one win due to subpar performances from Chrona. The mediocre play seemed to drive the Swedish netminder to up his game and he reeled off three consecutive shutouts over the succeeding two weeks. While his performance did eventually cool off, Chrona remained stout in goal and helped Denver produce another long winning streak, this time posting nine victories in a row.

Brink leading the charge
Bobby Brink had gotten off to a decent start, with 21 points in his first 16 games, but it was after returning from the winter break that he got into his groove. From December 31 to February 19, Brink scored at least one point in every game and averaged two per game. He raced to the top of the scoring lead, taking Denver to the top of the national scoring totals with average of just over four and quarter goals per game for the year. While Brink was aided somewhat by the temporary absence of Nathan Smith due to trip to Beijing for the 2022 Winter Olympics, he nevertheless became just the second player in program history and the first in 40 years to lead the nation in scoring.

Young guns
While the Pioneers were led by their upper-classmen, four freshmen were making key contributions to the team's success. Carter Mazur and Massimo Rizzo were both clicking along at more than a point-per-game pace while Sean Behrens and Shai Buium aided an already impressive group on the blueline. Each of the four would eventually end up being named to the convergence All-Rookie Team the most ever for one program in a single year.

Bumps in the road
Denver ended the regular season with a few blemishes on its record. However, due to the difficulty of their schedule, the Pioneers didn't see any real drop to their rankings and were mathematically guaranteed to make the NCAA tournament before the season was over. The small rough patch allowed North Dakota to catch up to the Pioneers in the conference standings, however, Denver was able to keep in contact with the Hawks and earn a regular season co-championship. Since the Pioneers possessed the tie-breaker, Denver was able to open postseason play against the worst team in the conference, Miami. The 3rd-ranked Pioneers made easy work of the RedHawks, outshooting their opponents 82–47 and riding their power play to two comfortable wins.

When the team travelled north to the less-friendly Xcel Energy Center, the Pioneers saw their scoring dry up entirely. In a tremendous goaltending battle between Chrona and Ryan Fanti, Denver was shutout for the first time on the season and saw their hoped for a conference championship evaporate.

Championship run
Denver was one of four western teams to receive a #1 seed for the NCAA Tournament. Due to their campus' proximity to the West Regional in Loveland, Colorado, the Pioneers were the only top seed to play any tournament games close to home. Despite the advantage, the team got a tough fight from Massachusetts Lowell in the opening game. The River Hawks opened the scoring and used strong defensive play to keep the game tied well into the third period. After a penalty-filled sequence in the final frame, Denver was able to score twice and take the match 3–2. The regional final gave Denver an opportunity for revenge when it set them against Minnesota Duluth, who had knocked them out of the NCHC tournament. Similar to their prior meeting, the two teams were a match for one another early in the game and the Bulldogs managed to score first. When Cole Guttman tied the game a few minutes later, however, he ended Fanti's shutout streak that had begun more than three games earlier. The goal gave Denver the momentum entering the second but the Pioneers were unable to get another puck past the UMD netminder in the middle frame. The conference rivals remained knotted at 1-all well into the third period when the puck pin-balled around the Duluth cage before Carter Savoie was able to slip it into the cage for the eventual game-winner.

In the national semifinal, Denver met one of the championship favorites in Michigan who boasted no less than seven 1st-round draft picks. The high level of talent, however, did not stop the Pioneers from taking over the game for long stretches. The Pioneers played a nearly perfect game, outshooting the Wolverines 33–21 and not taking a single penalty in the match but were still unable to put any distance between the two teams. Denver twice took the lead in the match but Michigan tied the score on both occasions, forcing the two into overtime. 15 minutes into the extra session, the hero of the regional final, Carter Savoie, received a pass from Brink and potted the winner on his own rebound to send Denver to the championship game.

National Championship
The final game for the Pioneers came against the top team in the nation, Minnesota State. The Mavericks had been atop the national rankings since mid-January and were one of the top three team national for both offense and defense. In the first two periods, Denver looked outmatched by the veteran lineup and were held scoreless on just 8 shots. Entering the third, the only glimmer of hope for the Pioneers was that they were down by just 1 goal and the team came out flying in the final frame. Ryan Barrow tied the game less than five minutes into the third period and he was soon followed by Michael Benning and Massimo Rizzo. The reversal of fortune was so sudden that Minnesota State seemed unable to get back to their game and the Pioneers carried the play for the remainder of the match. two empty-net goals sealed the game for Denver and the program skated away with its ninth national championship.

Departures

Recruiting

Roster
As of August 12, 2021.

Standings

Schedule and results

|-
!colspan=12 style="color:white; background:#862633; " | Exhibition

|-
!colspan=12 style="color:white; background:#862633; " | Regular Season

|-
!colspan=12 style="color:white; background:#862633; " | 

|-
!colspan=12 style="color:white; background:#862633; " |

National Championship

(E1) Minnesota State vs. (W1) Denver

Scoring statistics

Goaltending statistics

Rankings

Note: USCHO did not release a poll in week 24.

Awards and honors

Players drafted into the NHL

2022 NHL Entry Draft

† incoming freshman

References

2021-22
Denver Pioneers
Denver Pioneers
Denver Pioneers
Denver Pioneers
NCAA men's ice hockey Frozen Four seasons